The ZX81 is a home computer that was produced by Sinclair Research and manufactured in Dundee, Scotland, by Timex Corporation. It was launched in the United Kingdom in March 1981 as the successor to Sinclair's ZX80 and designed to be a low-cost introduction to home computing for the general public. It was hugely successful; more than 1.5 million units were sold. In the United States it was initially sold as the ZX-81 under licence by Timex. Timex later produced its own versions of the ZX81: the Timex Sinclair 1000 and Timex Sinclair 1500. Unauthorized ZX81 clones were produced in several countries.

The ZX81 was designed to be small, simple, and above all, inexpensive, with as few components as possible. Video output is to a television set rather than a dedicated monitor. Programs and data are loaded and saved onto compact audio cassettes. It uses only four silicon chips and a mere 1 KB of memory. It has no power switch or moving parts, with the exception of a VHF TV channel selector switch present in some models. It has a pressure-sensitive membrane keyboard. The ZX81's limitations prompted a market in third-party peripherals to improve its capabilities. Its distinctive case and keyboard brought designer Rick Dickinson a Design Council award.

The ZX81 could be bought by mail order preassembled or, for a lower price, in kit form. It was the first inexpensive mass-market home computer to be sold by high street stores, led by W. H. Smith and soon many other retailers. The ZX81 marked the point when computing in Britain became an activity for the general public rather than the preserve of businessmen and electronics hobbyists. It produced a huge community of enthusiasts, some of whom founded their own businesses producing software and hardware for the ZX81. Many went on to have roles in the British computer industry. The ZX81's commercial success made Sinclair Research one of Britain's leading computer manufacturers and earned a fortune and an eventual knighthood for the company's founder Sir Clive Sinclair.

Features 

The ZX81 has a base configuration of 1 KB of on-board memory that can officially be expanded externally to 16 KB. The memory is provided by either a single 4118 (1024 bit × 8) or two 2114 (1024 bit × 4) RAM chips. There are only three other onboard chips: a 3.5 MHz Z80A 8-bit microprocessor from NEC, an uncommitted logic array (ULA) chip from Ferranti, and an 8 KB ROM providing a simple Sinclair BASIC interpreter. The entire machine weighs just . Early versions of the external RAM cartridge contain 15 KB of memory using an assortment of memory chips, while later versions contain 16 KB chips, but the lowest addressed kilobyte is disabled.

The front part of the case is occupied by an integrated 40-key membrane keyboard displaying 20 graphic and 54 inverse video characters. Each key has up to five functions, accessed via the SHIFT and FUNCTION keys or depending on context. For example, the P key combines the letter P, the " character, and the BASIC commands PRINT and TAB. The ZX81 uses a standard QWERTY keyboard layout. The keyboard is mechanically very simple, consisting of 40 pressure-pad switches and 8 diodes under a plastic overlay, connected in a matrix of 8 rows and 5 columns.

The ZX81's primary input/output is delivered via four sockets on the left side of the case. The machine uses an ordinary UHF television set to deliver a monochrome picture via a built-in RF modulator. It can display 24 lines of 32 characters each, and by using the selection of 2×2 block character graphics from the machine's character set offers an effective 64 × 44 pixel graphics mode, also directly addressable via BASIC using the PLOT and UNPLOT commands, leaving 2 lines free at the bottom. Two 3.5 mm jacks connect the ZX81 to the EAR (output) and MIC (input) sockets of an audio cassette recorder, enabling data to be saved or loaded. This stores each data bit as a number of pulses followed by an inter-bit silence of 1300 µs. Each pulse is a 150 µs 'high' then a 150 µs 'low'. A '0' bit consists of four pulses while a '1' bit is nine pulses, so the baud rate varies between 400 bit/s for all '0's and 250 bit/s for all '1's. A file with equal amounts of '0's and '1's would be stored at 307 bit/s (38 bytes/sec). This provides a somewhat temperamental storage medium for the machine, which has no built-in storage capabilities. The ZX81 requires 420 mA of power at 7–11 V DC, delivered via a custom 9 V Sinclair DC power supply.

The ULA chip, described by the ZX81 manual as the "dogsbody" of the system, has a number of key functions that competing computers share between multiple chips and integrated circuits. These comprise the following:
 Synchronising the screen display;
 Generating a 6.5 MHz clock, from which a 3.25 MHz clock is derived for the processor;
 Outputting an audio signal to a cassette recorder in SAVE mode;
 Processing the incoming cassette audio signal in LOAD mode;
 Sensing keystrokes;
 Using memory addresses provided by the CPU to decide when ROM and RAM should be active;
 Controlling general system timing.

The ZX81's built-in RF modulator can output a video picture to a UHF 625-line television (used in the UK, Australia, and most western European countries). France and Luxembourg required a slightly modified version of the machine to match the positive video modulation of CCIR System L sets, while the US and Canada required a different ULA chip and modulator to cope with their 525-line VHF (NTSC) television systems. Both the ZX81 and its predecessor, the ZX80, have a significant drawback in the way that they handle visual output. Neither machine has enough processing power to run at full speed and simultaneously maintain the screen display. On the ZX80, this means that the screen goes blank every time the machine carries out a computation and causes an irritating flicker whenever a shorter computation – such as processing a keystroke – takes place.

The ZX81's designers adopted an improved approach, involving the use of two modes called SLOW and FAST respectively. In SLOW mode, also called "compute and display" mode, the ZX81 concentrates on driving the display. It runs the current program for only about a quarter of the time – in effect slowing the machine down fourfold, although in practice the speed difference between FAST and SLOW modes depends on what computation is being done. In FAST mode, processing occurs continuously, but the display is abandoned to its own devices – equivalent to the ZX80's standard operating mode.

Another hardware quirk produced one of the most distinctive aspects of the ZX81's screen display – during loading or saving, moving zigzag stripes appear across the screen. The same pin on the ULA is used to handle the video signal and the tape output, producing the stripes as an interference pattern of sorts. The ULA cannot maintain the display during SAVE and LOAD operations, as it has to operate continuously to maintain the correct baud rate for data transfers. The interference produces the zigzag stripes.

The unexpanded ZX81's tiny memory presents a major challenge to programmers. Simply displaying a full screen takes up to 793 bytes, the system variables take up another 125 bytes, and the program, input buffer and stacks need more memory on top of that. Nonetheless, ingenious programmers are able to achieve a surprising amount with just 1 KB. One example is the Super Micro Chess Engine by Stefano Maragò, which includes all of the rules of chess. The ZX81 conserves its memory to a certain extent by representing entire BASIC commands as one-byte tokens, stored as individual "characters" in the upper reaches of the machine's unique (non-ASCII) character set.

The edge connector or external interface at the rear of the ZX81 is an extension of the main printed circuit board. This provides a set of address, control, and data lines that can be used to communicate with external devices. Enthusiasts and a variety of third-party companies make use of this facility to create a wide range of add-ons for the ZX81.

Comparisons with other computing devices 
The following table provides a comparison between the capabilities of the ZX81 and various other competing microcomputers that were available in June 1981, about the time that the first ZX81 orders were delivered. The prices given are as of June 1981 from Your Computer UK.

N.B.: Commodore PET includes monitor and cassette recorder.  The Video Genie includes a built in cassette recorder.  The Compukit 101 is an Ohio Scientific SuperBoard made under licence in Britain.  Compukit 101 and MicroTan are kit computers and are not supplied with a case.

The Atari 400 and TRS-80 model I were officially only expandable to 16 KB, but expansion to 48 KB was available from third party suppliers.

The ZX81 and the other systems referred to as having block graphics have a resolution of 256 × 192 pixels, there are 32 columns × 22 rows of text and graphics can be addressed in quarter character blocks.

History

Background 

Clive Sinclair, a former radio kit salesman, established his first company, Sinclair Radionics, in 1962. The company made its name producing a wide range of cheap electronics aimed at the hobbyist market. Its products include amplifiers, radios, multimeters and other items which were generally sold in kit form to hi-fi enthusiasts and other electronics hobbyists. The company entered a new market in 1972 when it launched the first "slimline" pocket calculator, the Sinclair Executive. Radionics followed up by launching a wide range of pocket calculators. The company's subsequent expansion made it Europe's biggest calculator manufacturer by 1975.

By the late 1970s, however, Sinclair Radionics was experiencing serious difficulties. It lost its ability to compete effectively in the calculator market following the launch of a new generation of Japanese-produced calculators with liquid-crystal displays, which were much more capable and power-efficient than Sinclair's LED calculators. Projects to develop a pocket television and digital watch turned out to be expensive failures. The company made losses of more than £350,000 in 1975–76, bringing it to the edge of bankruptcy. In July 1977 Radionics was rescued by a state agency, the National Enterprise Board (NEB), which recapitalised it, provided a loan facility and took effective control of the company by acquiring a 73% stake.

Clive Sinclair's relationship with the NEB was fraught due to conflicting notions about which direction the company should go. Radionics had begun a project to develop a home computer but the NEB wanted to concentrate on the instrument side of the business, which was virtually the only area where Radionics was profitable. Sinclair disagreed vehemently with what he characterised as the view "that there was no future in consumer electronics". This and other disputes led to Sinclair resigning from Radionics in July 1979.

While he was struggling with the NEB, Clive Sinclair turned to a "corporate lifeboat" in the shape of an existing corporate shell under his exclusive control – a company called Ablesdeal Ltd, which he had established in 1973 and later renamed Science of Cambridge. It became a vehicle through which he could pursue his own projects, free of the interference of the NEB. Despite his later success in the field, Sinclair saw computers as merely a means to an end. As he told the Sunday Times in April 1985, "We only got involved in computers in order to fund the rest of the business", specifically the development of the ultimately unsuccessful TV80 pocket television and C5 electric vehicle. In an interview with Practical Computing, Sinclair explained:

Precursors: the MK14 and ZX80 

By the late 1970s, American companies were producing simple home computer kits such as the MITS Altair and IMSAI 8080. This aroused interest among electronics hobbyists in the UK but relatively high prices and lower disposable income reduced the appeal of the American products. New Scientist stated in 1977 that "the price of an American kit in dollars rapidly translates into the same figure in pounds sterling by the time it has reached the shores of Britain". Off-the-shelf personal computers were also available for the high end of the market but were extremely expensive; Olivetti's offering cost £2,000, and the Commodore PET, launched in 1979, sold for £700. There was nothing for the hobbyist at the low end of the market. Sinclair realised that this provided a useful commercial opportunity.

Sinclair's first home computer was the MK14, which was launched in kit form in June 1978. It was a long way from being a mass-market product. Its very name – MK standing for "Microcomputer Kit" – was indicative of its origins as a product developed by, and for, hobbyists. It had no screen but instead used an LED segment display (though Science of Cambridge did produce an add-on module allowing it to be hooked up to a UHF TV); it had no case, consisting of an exposed circuit board; it had no built-in storage capabilities and only 256 bytes of memory; and input was via a 20-key hexadecimal keyboard. Despite the limitations of the machine it sold a respectable 10–15,000 units; by comparison, the much more expensive Apple II had only sold 9,000 units in the United States, a much bigger market, in 1978. This success convinced Clive Sinclair that there was an untapped market for low-cost computers that could profitably be exploited.

Sinclair followed up the MK14 by producing the ZX80, at the time the world's smallest and cheapest computer, which was launched in January 1980 costing £99.95 (equivalent to £390 at 2021 prices.) The company conducted no market research whatsoever prior to the launch of the ZX80; according to Clive Sinclair, he "simply had a hunch" that the general public was sufficiently interested to make such a project feasible and went ahead with ordering 100,000 sets of parts so that he could launch at high volume.

The ZX80's design introduced many key features that were carried over to the ZX81; as Sinclair himself later said, "the ZX80 was very much a stepping stone to the ZX81". The design was driven entirely by the desired price – the machine had to cost less than £100 but still make a healthy profit. Its distinctive wedge-shaped white case concealing the circuitry and the touch-sensitive membrane keyboard were the brainchild of Rick Dickinson, a young British industrial designer who had recently been hired by Sinclair. As he later recalled of Sinclair's approach, "Everything was cost driven. The design was the face of the machine." The unconventional keyboard was the outcome of Sinclair's cost-cutting. It made use of a sheet of plastic, on which the keys were printed, overlaying a metallic circuit that registered when a key was pressed. This avoided the expense of providing a typewriter-style keyboard, though the design had many drawbacks when it came to usability and "feel".

Inside the case, there were many more similarities with the ZX81. Like its successor, it used the Z80A microprocessor and had only 1 KB of on-board RAM. It came with a specially written BASIC interpreter on a dedicated ROM chip and could use a television as a display. It relied on an ordinary cassette tape recorder for data storage. The main difference between the two machines lay in the internal software; when the ZX81 was released, ZX80 owners were able to upgrade by the relatively simple expedient of plugging a new ROM onto the circuit board.

The ZX80 was an immediate success, selling 20,000 units over the following nine months. Science of Cambridge was producing ZX80s at the rate of 9,000 a month by the end of 1980 and within 18 months of its launch the company had sold 100,000 units. The commercial success of the ZX80 made a follow-up product inevitable. The company was renamed Sinclair Computers in November 1980, reflecting its new focus, and became Sinclair Research in March 1981.

BBC Micro bid 
The launch of the ZX81 was catalysed in part by the BBC Computer Literacy Project's plan to produce The Computer Programme TV series, to be broadcast in 1982, aimed at popularising computing and programming. The BBC intended to commission an existing manufacturer to provide it with a BBC-branded home computer to tie in with the series. When Clive Sinclair heard of the project in December 1980, he wrote to the BBC informing them that he would be announcing a new version of the ZX80, to be called the ZX81, in early 1981. It would remedy some of the ZX80's deficiencies and would be both cheaper and more advanced. Sinclair wanted the ZX81 to be a candidate for the BBC contract and lobbied for its adoption. He pointed out that there were already 40,000 users of the ZX80 and that by the time the series was broadcast there were likely to be upwards of 100,000 ZX81 users (which turned out to be an underestimate by over 400,000 – an indication of how the ZX81's success exceeded even Sinclair's expectations).

A prototype ZX81 was demonstrated to BBC representatives in January 1981, while Sinclair's local rival Acorn Computers put forward their proposed Proton computer, a design – of which a prototype did not yet exist – based on the Acorn Atom. To Sinclair's dismay, the contract to produce the BBC Micro went to Acorn, which launched the machine in January 1982. Paul Kriwaczek, the producer of The Computer Programme, explained his reservations in a March 1982 interview with Your Computer:

Sinclair was critical of the BBC's decision, accusing it of incompetence and arrogance. Shortly after Acorn won the BBC contract the Government issued a recommended list of computers, including the BBC Micro and Research Machines 380Z, that schools could purchase, with the aid of a grant, for half price; Sinclair's computers were not included on the list. Sinclair responded by launching his own half-price deal, offering schools the chance to buy a ZX81 and 16 KB RAM pack for £60, plus a ZX Printer at half price, for a total cost of £90. As the cheapest Government-approved system was £130, this was an attractive offer for some schools and about 2,300 bought Sinclair's package, although 85% adopted the BBC Micro.

Development and manufacture 

The development of the ZX81 got under way even before the ZX80 had been launched. Sinclair's chief engineer, Jim Westwood, was given the task of improving the ZX80's hardware to reduce the number of components and thus bring down the cost. He also sought to fix some of the more annoying problems with the ZX80. Westwood and his colleagues found that the component count could be reduced greatly by combining eighteen of the ZX80's chips into a single uncommitted logic array (ULA), a type of general-purpose chip full of logic gates that were connected up as the customer required during chip manufacture. This short-lived technology of the day was cheaper and quicker than the design of a customised logic chip, which typically required very high volumes to recoup its development cost. Ferranti produced the new chip for Sinclair, who hailed Westwood's design as a triumph of innovation: "The ZX81 had four chips when our nearest competitor in this respect, the TRS-80, had 44." Only 70% of the logic gates on the ULA were supposed to be used, but Sinclair decided to use them all to squeeze more functions in. This resulted in the machine becoming uncomfortably warm during usage. Computing folklore held that the ZX81 had to be refrigerated by balancing a carton of cold milk on top of the case.

The ZX81's ROM was doubled to 8 KB, from the ZX80's 4 KB ROM. This enabled a fuller implementation of a version of ANSI Minimal BASIC (termed Sinclair BASIC by the company). Clive Sinclair re-commissioned a company called Nine Tiles, which had produced the ZX80 ROM, to develop the new ROM software for the ZX81. The code was written by John Grant, the owner of Nine Tiles, and Steve Vickers, who had joined the company in January 1980. Grant concentrated on the software that drove the ZX81's hardware, while Vickers developed the new BASIC and the accompanying manual. Sinclair's brief to the pair was fairly non-specific but primarily concerned remedying a key defect of the ZX80 so that the new machine could be used for practical programming and calculations. Vickers later recalled:

The new ROM incorporated trigonometric and floating-point functions, which its predecessor had lacked – the ZX80 could only deal with whole numbers. Grant came up with one of the ZX81's more novel features, a syntax checker that indicated errors in BASIC code as soon as it was entered (rather than, as was standard at the time, only disclosing coding errors when a program was run). Unfortunately for Vickers, he introduced a briefly notorious error – the so-called "square-root bug" that caused the square root of 0.25 to be returned erroneously as 1.3591409 – as a result of problems with integrating the ZX Printer code into the ROM. Although it was eventually fixed, the bug became the subject of controversy and Sinclair was forced to replace some of the ZX81s sold to early customers. On a more positive note, Vickers' work on the manual was received favourably, being described in 1983 as "one of the classic texts on BASIC". Max Phillips commented in a What Micro? retrospective:

The task of designing the ZX81's case again fell to Rick Dickinson, who produced an updated version of the ZX80's wedge-shaped case. This time round, the design team were able to use injection moulding, which enabled them to deliver a higher-quality case. Dickinson originally envisaged the ZX81 as "an expandable range of boxes following a vaguely modular approach with a common width", though this approach was eventually dropped. From start to finish, the design process took about six months.

The ZX81 was launched on 5 March 1981 in two versions (though with identical components) – a pre-assembled machine or a cheaper kit version, which the user could assemble himself. Both versions were manufactured in Dundee, Scotland by Timex Corporation at the company's Dryburgh factory. Timex had not been an obvious choice of manufacturing subcontractor, as the company had little previous experience in assembling electronics. It was a well-established manufacturer of mechanical watches but was facing a crisis at the beginning of the 1980s. Profits had dwindled to virtually zero as the market for mechanical watches stagnated in the face of competition from the digital and quartz watches. Recognising the trend, Timex's director, Fred Olsen, determined that the company would diversify into other areas of business.

This shift by Timex came at an ideal time for Sinclair. The ZX80 had proved more popular than expected and Sinclair's existing manufacturer, a small electronics company in St Ives, lacked the resources to deal with the demand. Timex took over production of the ZX80 late in 1980. The arrangement worked well for both companies and Timex took on the manufacture of the ZX81, aided by capital investment in its Dundee plant. Sinclair initially planned to produce 10,000 ZX81s a month, rising to 30,000 a month within a year. However, Timex initially had significant problems in producing enough ZX81s to satisfy demand. As a consequence, it took up to nine weeks for ZX81s to be delivered by mail order. It was not until September 1981, five months after the launch of the ZX81, that the delivery times finally came down to the promised twenty-eight days. Those who already owned or had recently ordered the ZX80 were not excluded; anyone who had ordered a ZX80 in the two weeks before the ZX81's launch would receive the newer machine, while existing owners were able to upgrade their ZX80s by plugging an extra £20 ROM chip into the circuit board.

The reliability of the ZX81 was controversial. W.H. Smith, one of the machine's key distributors, had a company policy of ordering a third more ZX81s than were actually required for sale, so that it would have enough replacements for faulty machines. Similar problems were reported in the US market, where contemporary reports suggested that only a third of the ZX81s shipped actually worked. However, figures released by Sinclair claimed that only 2.4 per cent of pre-assembled machines were returned, although 13 per cent of kits were returned. Clive Sinclair strongly denied any problem with reliability:

Sinclair attributed the higher failure rate of the kits to customers breaking the components by inserting or soldering them the wrong way, though the company admitted that there was a persistent problem with power supplies that affected both kits and pre-assembled ZX81s. The bigger problem was perhaps Sinclair's lack of after-sales service, which Robin Clarke of New Scientist described as "one of the worst after-sales performance records of any company ever established." The Financial Times observed that "Clive Sinclair's offices are filled with returned computers which can take months to be repaired." The company's slowness in replacing returns and delivering freshly ordered machines meant that Sinclair Research gained a reputation for poor customer service.

Marketing 
The marketing of the ZX81 was handled by Sinclair's long-standing marketing agency Primary Contact (now part of Ogilvy & Mather), which had provided marketing services for Sinclair since 1971 and was to continue doing so until 1985. Sinclair's entry into the nascent home computing market gave Primary Contact a major challenge – how to market a product simultaneously at hobbyists and at the "man on the street", who probably had little or no computer literacy. The answer was to pursue what the journalist David O'Reilly of MicroScope magazine described as a single-minded "user-friendly strategy." Chris Fawkes, one of Primary Contact's directors, explained: "We brought personal computers to the mass market by showing that you didn't have to be a whizzkid to use one." As Clive Sinclair put it in a 1982 interview with Your Computer,

According to Ben Rosen, by pricing the ZX81 so low, "Sinclair has opened up a completely new market among people who had never previously considered owning a computer." Clive Sinclair acknowledged the role that guesswork had played in his decision to launch the ZX81 on such a large scale: "It was a surmise that the man in the street would want such a computer. He does, and our information is that a lot of people are using the machines avidly." A New Scientist retrospective published in 1986 commented:

High-profile advertising was central to the marketing campaign. Although Sinclair Research was a relatively small company, it had a long-standing policy of using large-scale advertisements that stood out in stark contrast to the more muted advertisements of other manufacturers. Superlatives, exhortations, appeals to patriotism, testimonials, eye-catching drawings and photographs on double-page spreads, varying from month to month, were used to drum up mail order business for Sinclair. The launch advertising for the ZX81 illustrates this approach. A photograph of the ZX81 alongside the official Sinclair peripherals dominated the centre of a double-page spread. The value for money of Sinclair's products was emphasised by the prices being printed in larger type than any other text on the spread. The ZX81's benefits were promoted with the aspirational slogan "Sinclair ZX81 Personal Computer – the heart of a system that grows with you". The advertisement highlighted ZX81 BASIC Programming, the manual written by Steve Vickers, as "a complete course in BASIC programming, from first principles to complex programs." The educational benefits of the ZX81 were stressed ("it's still very simple to teach yourself computing") and its technical advantages were explained in relatively non-technical terms. For instance, the ZX81's idiosyncratic method of typing commands with a single keystroke – the result of the memory-saving method of using one-byte tokens to represent keywords – was presented as "eliminat[ing] a great deal of tiresome typing". The ZX81's British character was emphasised; it was "designed by Sinclair and custom-built in Britain." Sinclair's advertising in the United States provides an illustration of how the company perceived the ZX81's purpose:

This approach to advertising was driven by Sinclair's reliance on mail-order marketing. It came with a high up-front cost in terms of purchasing space in publications but it had the advantage of ensuring that all sales were firm and pre-paid. A big splash on launch produced a large influx of cash at the outset of a campaign, though it did also depend on the advertiser having enough product to satisfy the initial surge in demand. The advertisements served an additional purpose of priming the market for over-the-counter sales by "getting the story across", as Clive Sinclair put it: "Not that big a proportion do buy on mail order, but they see the ads, and that helps to prepare them for buying when the item appears in the shops."

Sinclair himself became a focal point for the marketing campaign, putting a human face on the business, while Sinclair Research was portrayed in the media as a plucky British challenger taking on the technical and marketing might of giant American and Japanese corporations. As David O'Reilly noted, "by astute use of public relations, particularly playing up his image of a Briton taking on the world, Sinclair has become the best-known name in micros." The popular press soon latched onto the image. His "Uncle Clive" persona is said to have been created by the gossip columnist for Personal Computer World, while the media praised Sinclair as a visionary genius (or even, in the words of The Sun, "the most prodigious inventor since Leonardo.") As Ian Adamson and Richard Kennedy put it, Sinclair outgrew "the role of microcomputer manufacturer and accepted the mantle of pioneering boffin leading Britain into a technological utopia."

Pricing was central to the marketing strategy, as it had been through Sinclair's career. The ZX81 had been designed to meet a £70 price point and was launched at a price of £69.95 (built) or £49.95 (kit). One Sinclair brochure presented a side-by-side comparison of the ZX81 with the four machines that Sinclair considered its main rivals – the Acorn Atom, Apple II Plus, Commodore PET and TRS-80. The comparison highlighted the vast differences in cost, from £630 in the case of the Apple II Plus to just £70 for the ZX81, though even by Sinclair's own comparison the Apple was by far the more capable machine.

According to Sinclair himself, the £69.95 price was chosen after applying the "experience curve" developed by the Boston Consulting Group. Sinclair's prior experience in the calculator market had highlighted the fact that a product will be more profitable selling at (for instance) twice the manufactured cost than at three times. He could have launched the ZX81 at a higher price, marketing it in a more traditional way as a premium product, but chose not to. In effect, he used the lower price to establish an unassailable lead before the competition moved in.

An essential part of Sinclair's marketing strategy was to use regular cost-cutting at strategic intervals to maintain market share. Ian Adamson and Richard Kennedy comment that Sinclair's approach was "to secure and extend [his] market lead and panic the competition. While most companies reduce prices when their products are in steep decline, Sinclair tends to discount shortly after sales have peaked. The advantage of his approach is that vacillating customers are drawn into the fold while the product's promotion retains a commercial urgency, and the costings of the competition are thrown into utter disarray."

This tactic proved highly successful, with Sinclair announcing by March 1982 that it had sold 250,000 ZX81s worldwide. 50,000 computers were sold each month, 60% outside the UK, despite Sinclair and W. H. Smith being the only distributors. When sales fell in the wake of the launch of its successor, the ZX Spectrum, Sinclair reduced the price of the pre-assembled version to £49.95 in May 1982. It was cut by another £10 the following April. Despite the increased competition from much more capable computers, the ZX81 was still shipping in excess of 30,000 units a month even as late as July 1983, more than two years after it had been launched. By that time, according to Sinclair Research, over 1.5 million ZX81s had been sold.

Distribution 

The ZX81's distribution arrangements were an essential part of its success and marked a watershed in the way that computers were sold in the UK. Sinclair had previously made its name as a mail-order retailer – the ZX81 was initially available only through mail-order – but the only truly effective way to reach the mass market was via high street stores. Fortunately for Sinclair, an opportunity to do just that was provided by W.H. Smith, a venerable book- and magazine-seller and stationery chain. The company had stagnated in the 1970s and was looking for ways to revitalise its image and expand its product range.

Smith's had begun selling audio and photographic equipment and calculators at the end of the 1970s, with a modest degree of success. In 1980 its marketing development manager, John Rowland, hit upon the idea of creating "Computer Know-How" sections in major branches to sell computer books and magazines. Most of the items on display were imports from the United States but their relatively high cost reduced their attractiveness to the casual buyer. The commercial success and mass market potential of the ZX80 caught Rowland's interest; he approached Sinclair, saw a prototype ZX81 and agreed to market the machine through Smith's on an exclusive basis for the first six months after launch. As Rowland put it, "what we've done now is bring the computer-orientated publications together with an actual computer, to create the Computer Know-How section of the store", alongside computer software and blank cassette tapes. The ZX81 would be sold in 112 stores around the UK and would serve as the centrepiece of the "Computer Know-How" sections.

Selling the ZX81 over the counter was seen as something of a gamble and Rowland's colleagues were initially unenthusiastic about the scheme. Branch buyers thought that the ZX81 was unlikely to sell more than 10–15 units per branch at launch. Rowland himself thought that the ZX81 would sell about 10,000 units during the first five months of the retail agreement, equivalent to one month's mail order sales by Sinclair. In the event, the ZX81 was a massive success for Smith's, it went on sale for  making it the first home PC in the UK to retail for under . The "Computer Know-How" sections were swamped with eager customers, overwhelming the 300 staff who had been trained to demonstrate the machines; a Financial Times correspondent wrote of being "dazed and bewildered by the crowds of schoolchildren clustered round the ZX81 in your local branch of W.H. Smith." Sales of peripherals, software, books and magazines netted even more profit.

The British chain stores Boots, John Menzies and Currys began selling the ZX81 as soon as Smith's exclusive distribution deal expired and a number of companies secured overseas distribution rights for the ZX81, which was being sold in 18 countries by March 1982. To be useful the computer needed an extra  RAM pack which cost . Sales reached 15,000 a month by January 1982, while American Express sold thousands more to its own customers. In February 1982 Timex obtained a licence from Sinclair to sell the ZX81 directly through thousands of retail outlets in the US, paying Sinclair Research a 5 per cent royalty on all Sinclair hardware and software sold by Timex. The company was later to produce its own licensed clones and variants of the ZX81. The Japanese market's favourable reaction to the ZX81 led Mitsui to begin selling the ZX81 over the counter in large bookshops from September 1982, with annual sales of 20,000 units predicted. In the Netherlands, the regular Sinclair ZX81 was for sale as well as a Bang & Olufsen branded version called Beocomp.

The ZX81 was also sold for a while in duty-free shops at UK airports. However, this fell foul of government export restrictions aimed at preventing the Soviet bloc countries from obtaining Western high technology goods. It was not uncommon for visitors from the Soviet Union and other eastern European countries to pick up gadgets in Western countries with the aim of transferring their technology to their own states' industries. In 1983 the government ordered that the ZX81s were to be withdrawn from sale at airports. There was no such restriction on sales to communist China and in November 1983 Sinclair Research announced that it had signed an agreement to export ZX81 kits to a factory in Guangzhou, where they would be assembled for the Chinese market.

Reception 

Reviews of the ZX81 highlighted the great value for money offered by the machine but noted its technical shortcomings. As Tim Hartnell put it in Your Computer, "the ZX81 is both a delight and a disappointment". He applauded the improvements that had been made over the ZX80, such as a much better manual, display and string handling, and called the ZX81 "a very good first computer" that "will open the world of computing to many who would be denied access to it by cost." However, the built-in memory was so small that use of a memory expansion pack was "mandatory for any worthwhile use". He also found the ZX81 to be alarmingly unreliable, having to have his first two test machines replaced before getting one that worked properly.

New Scientist's Malcolm Peltu commented that it was "great technical value for money particularly for computing enthusiasts" but thought that others were "likely to be bored very quickly by the basic system". He highlighted weaknesses in the manual and Sinclair's accompanying software, criticising them for "a misconceived design and sloppiness in execution which make the machine seem harder to use and more limited than it should" and questioned whether it might be more worthwhile to save up for a more powerful computer such as Acorn or Commodore's offerings. Overall, he concluded, the ZX81 might have a limited value in helping to teach BASIC programming and overcoming psychological barriers to computing, but "the Sinclair systems have a long way to go before they raise the quality and level of understanding of the nature and use of computer-based information systems among computer unbelievers."

While the editor of Personal Computer World was on holiday in May 1981, his colleagues publicised the magazine's review of the ZX81 with a cover showing a chimpanzee with the machine above the strapline "Editor benchtests the ZX81". (The chimp returned in later issues to "benchtest" all of Sinclair's subsequent computers.) The review, which was written by PCW staffer Dave Tebbutt, acknowledged that the machine had significant shortcomings but nonetheless represented "absolutely amazing value for money". He described the ZX81 as "a lovely product which will have enormous appeal to people wanting to find out more about computers, but without it costing them an arm and a leg" and concluded: "If you know nothing about computers and you want to enjoy finding out about them, then this machine offers a value for money way of doing just that. Children will love the ZX81, there can be no question about that, and I suspect that more than a few people who are already familiar with computers will buy one, just to have a bit of fun."

Paul Taylor of the Financial Times found the ZX81 to be "a powerful and flexible little computer ideally suited as a fun introduction to the mysteries of home computing" but cautioned readers about its limitations. It lacked ready-made software, the keyboard was not easy to use, it did not have sufficiently advanced graphics to be able to replicate arcade-style games and its built-in memory was inadequate. Even so, he suggested, "the ZX81 is a unique British product, part toy, part puzzle, part learning tool and I think that, provided one accepts its limitations and recognises that any computer will only do what it is told to do, it is good value as an introduction to the hobby of home computing."

The Age described the ZX81 as "not extremely sophisticated, and its memory capability is rather limited. It also has a rather toy-like appearance". It concluded that the computer was "an ideal toy for youngsters who want to become acquainted with the computer world. It is responsive, cheap, and very easy to use".

Billy Garrett of Byte, who already owned a ZX80, complimented the Timex/Sinclair 1000s manual (although he regretted the removal of the British original's humour), the "state-of-the-art circuitry", and the BASIC for being "remarkably powerful" despite the small ROM size. He concluded that "the major use ... will probably be for learning about BASIC or computers in general. [It] has limited expansion capabilities, and the keyboard is too small and cramped for any serious work".

David Babsky described the ZX81 as "a wonderfully brainy little micro which won't let you waste your time and make a fool of yourself". In a comparison between the ZX81 and IBM PC published in Which Micro?, he commended the ZX81's user-friendliness and its on-the-fly syntax checking of BASIC programs, which he described as "the feature that I, as a newcomer to computing, want to see incorporated into every micro."

Peripherals and software 

The success of the ZX81 led almost immediately to enthusiasts producing a huge variety of peripherals and software. Clive Sinclair was "amused and gratified" by the attention the machine received but other than what Clarke described as "a few remarkably poor programs on cassette", his company made little effort to exploit the demand, effectively ceding a very lucrative market to third party suppliers, a decision that undoubtedly forfeited a lot of potential earnings. W.H. Smith, for instance, was able to exploit a peculiarity of the ZX81; owners found that technically obsolete low-fidelity mono tape cassette recorders worked better as storage devices than higher-quality music systems. Smith's purchased cheap "shoebox" cassette recorders in the Far East and sold them with the W.H. Smiths logo as "data recorders". Over 100,000 were sold in 18 months.

Sinclair released only two official peripherals for the ZX81, a 16 KB RAM pack (actually the same one previously released for the ZX80, but rebadged) and the ZX Printer, both of which plugged into the edge connector at the rear of the ZX81. They retailed at a launch price of £49.95 each but both had notable flaws. The RAM pack was top-heavy and was supported only by the edge connector. It had a habit of falling out of its socket at crucial points and crashing the ZX81, losing anything that the user had typed in. Users turned to using sticky lumps of chewing gum, double-sided tape or Blu-Tack to cure what became known as the "RAM pack wobble" problem. The ZX Printer was a tiny spark printer that used two electrically charged styli to burn away the surface of aluminium-coated paper to reveal the black underlay. It worked reasonably well at first but its output deteriorated rapidly after a time.

Many non-Sinclair peripherals aimed to remedy the ZX81's flaws and provide many new capabilities. These included RAM packs providing up to 64 KB of extra memory and promising to "fit snugly ... giving a firm connection" to the computer, typewriter-style keyboards, more advanced printers and sound generators, and even a hard disk interface, which Clive Sinclair thought was "quite overgilding the lily". A wide range of software was also published. Within only a year of the ZX81's launch, around 200 independent companies had been established to manufacture and sell Sinclair-compatible hardware. The people behind the ZX81 cottage industry were very often not computer professionals but were, as the Financial Times noted, "school teachers, civil servants, electrical engineers and technicians [who] have set up small operations in their own time".

The ZX81's popularity was publicly demonstrated in January 1982 when civil servant Mike Johnstone organised a "ZX Microfair" at Westminster Central Hall. Seventy exhibitors set up stalls with only a few hundred visitors expected in a hall with a capacity of 650 people. Tens of thousands, mostly youths, came from around Britain, and the police had to control the crowd. They queued for three hours around the hall, with a group of 50 entering as another group left. About 12,000 entered the hall; Clarke, who was only able to enter after identifying himself as a journalist, wrote that "no one knows how many gave up in despair". The exhibitors sold thousands of pounds' worth of software and hardware "as fast as three pairs of hands on each stall could hand them over and stuff the fivers into improvised overflowing cash boxes", he added. The fair also showed Sinclair Research's relatively unimportant role in the computer's success, with only small crowds at its booth compared to the "rugby scrum" elsewhere. By August 1983 seven more ZX Microfairs were held, with the 14th ZX Microfair at Alexandra Palace in November 1984, still organised by Johnstone.

Thousands of ZX81 programs were published, either as type-in programs or as ready-made applications that could be loaded from cassette tape. Many computer magazines featured ZX81 program listings – some, such as Sinclair Programs, were dedicated entirely to listings – while many individuals became the archetypal "bedroom programmers", producing games and applications which they produced, marketed, recorded, and sold from their own homes. Some went on to found their own software houses, employing teams of programmers – some still at school – to produce programs for the ZX81 and other computers. Existing companies also sold software; Psion produced a series of ZX81 programs in close association with Sinclair, including a flight simulator, while ICL's range of ZX81 programs sold over 100,000 cassettes in less than three months. Psion's success with the ZX81 had a profound effect on the future of the company. Its work on the ZX81 database program Vu-File led to Psion switching its focus to the development of personal digital assistants, which resulted in the launch in 1984 of the Psion Organiser, the world's first handheld personal computer. Some of the most popular ZX81 games (Psion's Flight Simulation being an example) were rewritten for the Spectrum to take advantage of the newer machine's colour and sound capabilities.

Enterprising programmers were able to produce games for the ZX81 using nothing more than text characters and the machine's limited text semigraphics. Some ZX81 games achieved lasting fame, such as 3D Monster Maze, a tense first-person perspective game that involved the player escaping a labyrinth with a Tyrannosaurus rex in pursuit. Written in a combination of BASIC and machine code, its innovative design led it to be hailed as the first home computer 3D game and a landmark in the history of computer and video games.

One of the more bizarre software products for the ZX81 came about as a result of music companies attempting to capitalise on the popularity of Sinclair's computers. In 1983, EMI released a single by Chris Sievey that had a ZX81 program recorded on the B-side. Island Records responded with XL1 by Buzzcocks frontman Pete Shelley, packaged with a program for the ZX Spectrum.

Clones and variants 

Sinclair's licensing agreement with Timex enabled the American company to produce three clones or offshoots of Sinclair machines for the US market. These were the Timex Sinclair 1000, Timex Sinclair 1500 (both variants of the ZX81) and the Timex Sinclair 2068 (a variant of the ZX Spectrum). The TS1000 was launched in July 1982 and sparked a massive surge of interest; at one point, the Timex phoneline was receiving over 5,000 calls an hour, 50,000 a week, inquiring about the machine or about microcomputers in general. It was virtually identical to the ZX81 save for re-branding and the addition of an extra 1 KB of memory, totalling 2 KB. In the five months following the TS1000's launch, the company sold 550,000 machines, earning Sinclair over $1.2 million in royalties.

Timex produced a second version of the ZX81 in the form of the TS1500, essentially an Americanised ZX81 launched in August 1983. It dispensed with the membrane keyboard and used a case similar to that of the ZX Spectrum, incorporating 16 KB of on-board memory. It was effectively a stopgap between the ZX81 and Spectrum. However, it was unsuccessful due to increased competition from rival US machines and the after-effects of Timex's botched marketing of the TS1000. Although the TS1000 had initially been a great success, Timex failed to provide the essential RAM pack upgrades to the market for two or three months after it launched the TS1000. Consumers would take the machine home, plug it in and find that it would not do anything useful due to the lack of memory.

In addition, consumers' attitude in the US was quite different from that in the UK. Clive Sinclair told Informatics magazine in June 1981 that "our competitors thought that consumers didn't want to learn programming. We [Sinclair Research] think they failed because of this and because of price." Timex evidently shared this belief but events proved it to be a false assumption. The TS1000/ZX81's price advantage was erased when its main rivals – the TI-99/4A and the VIC-20 – had their prices cut to below the all-important $100 mark. Competitors such as Apple, Atari, Commodore and Texas Instruments promoted their machines as being for business or entertainment rather than education, highlighting the value of computers with ready-made applications and more advanced features such as graphics, colour and sound.

By late 1983 Wayne Green reported a "rising chorus of frustrated Timex users who are telling friends not to waste their money." "Hard core" early adopters, he wrote, "became discouraged with the quality of the product, with the poverty of software available and with the almost total lack of information on how to cope with it." Consumers deserted the TS1000 once its novelty value had worn off and, as publishers of programming guides found to their cost, the American public showed little interest in using the machine to learn about computer programming. American retailers were left with large stocks of unsold machines. Burned by this experience, many were unwilling to stock the later Timex Sinclair machines in large numbers and the big chain stores dropped the Timex Sinclair line altogether.

Some companies outside the US and UK produced their own "pirate" versions of the ZX81 and Timex Sinclair computers, aided by weak intellectual property laws in their countries of origin. Several Brazilian companies produced ZX81 clones, notably the TK series (such as the TK85) from Microdigital Eletronica of Brazil) and Prológica's CP-200. Czerweny Electrónica of Argentina produced the CZ1000 and CZ1500, clones of the ZX81 and TS1500 respectively. Lambda Electronics of Hong Kong produced the Lambda 8300, based on the ZX81, which was itself widely copied by other Chinese manufacturers.

The machines were not all straight copies of the ZX81; some, such as the CP-200, came with extra memory and a larger case (often with a chiclet keyboard in place of the original membrane keyboard). One clone, the TL801 from TELLAB of Italy, could emulate either the ZX80 or ZX81 and switch between the two machines via a jumper.

Impact and legacy 
The ZX81 had an immediate impact on the fortunes of Sinclair Research and Clive Sinclair himself. The company's profitability rose enormously, from a pretax profit of £818,000 on a turnover of £4.6 million in 1980–81 to £8.55 million on a turnover of £27.17 million in 1981–82. Clive Sinclair became one of the UK's highest-profile businessmen and a millionaire, receiving a £1 million bonus on top of a salary of £13,000. He received a knighthood in the Queen's Birthday Honours and the Young Businessman of the Year award in 1983.

The machine also had a widespread and lasting social impact in the United Kingdom, according to Clive Sinclair, purchasers of the ZX81 came from "a reasonably broad spectrum" that ranged from readers of the upmarket Observer and Sunday Times newspapers to the more downmarket but numerous Sun readers. The largest age group was around 30 years old. The Financial Times reported in March 1982 that most Sinclair computers were being bought for educational purposes, both for adults and children, though the children were usually able to learn much more quickly. Ian Adamson and Richard Kennedy note that the popularity of the ZX81 was "subtly different from the run-of-the-mill social fad"; although most enthusiasts were in their teens or early twenties, many were older users – often parents who had become fascinated by the ZX81s that they had bought for their children. However, the ZX81 boom was overwhelmingly male-dominated.

One of the ZX81's key legacies was that it spurred large numbers of people to try programming for the first time. The ZX81 plays a significant part in the plot of William Gibson's 2003 novel Pattern Recognition. One character, an artist using old ZX81s as a sculptural medium, explains the cultural and intellectual impact that the machine had on British society:

Among those whose first experience of home computing was provided by the ZX81 are Terry Pratchett (who used it for "very primitive word processing"), Edward de Bono and – perhaps proving William Gibson's point – many video game developers including Charles Cecil, Raffaele Cecco, Pete Cooke, David Perry (whose first published game, a driving game, involved "a black blob avoiding other black blobs"), Rhianna Pratchett, and Jon Ritman.

Even 30 years after launch, the ZX81 has a German user forum, and one in English.

New hardware and software continue to be developed for the ZX81, including a ZX81-based webserver; the ZXpand, a combined SD card interface, 32K configurable memory expansion, and optional joystick port and AY sound interface; and new games on cassette tape by Cronosoft, such as Tut-Tut, Virus, One Little Ghost, and many more, as well as releases by Revival Studios, such as Avalanche, Mayhem, Down, Stairrunner and more.

References

Bibliography

Books

News reports

Other sources

External links 

 
 ZX81 The Archive
 ZX81 Software Downloads
 Sinclair ZX81 Teardown – a detailed look at the ZX81's hardware

1981 establishments in Scotland
Computer-related introductions in 1981
Computers designed in the United Kingdom
Economic history of Scotland
Economy of Dundee
Goods manufactured in Scotland
History of Dundee
Home computers
Products introduced in 1981
Timex Group
Z80-based home computers
Products and services discontinued in 1984
ZX81